Okroskedi is a village in the Ozurgeti Municipality of Guria in western Georgia. It is part of the Bakhvi community.

References

Populated places in Ozurgeti Municipality